Qasemabad-e Gorji (also Romanized as Qāsemābād-e Gorjī) is a village in Ramjin Rural District, Chaharbagh District, Savojbolagh County, Alborz Province, Iran. At the 2006 census, its population was 1,126, in 262 families.

References 

Populated places in Savojbolagh County